Ein Guru kommt is a 1980 German television film and is also Bruce Willis' second film role, as an uncredited extra. The film in English is called A Guru Comes.

Plot
A failed opera singer rises to the leader of a new religious community.

Satirical film about the new religious movements of the 1970s and 1980s.

External links 
 

German television films
1980 films
1980 television films
West German films
1980s German-language films
German-language television shows
ZDF original programming